The 2022 Team Speedway Junior European Championship was the 15th Team Speedway Junior European Championship season. It was organised by the Fédération Internationale de Motocyclisme and was the second time that the event had an age limit of under 23 years of age.

The final took place on 9 October 2022 in Tarnów, Poland. The defending champions Poland won again to claim the title for the 12th time.

Results

Final
 Tarnów, Poland
 9 October 2022

See also 
 2022 World Junior Championship
 2022 Individual Speedway Junior European Championship

References 

2022
European Team Junior